Married at First Sight is an American reality television series that first aired on July 8, 2014, on FYI (and later, Lifetime).

The series is based on a Danish series titled  that first aired on September 4, 2013, on DR3. The original Danish series format has been sold to broadcasters throughout the world.

Production and broadcast
The series first aired in the United States on FYI. Beginning with season two, it aired in simulcast on sister network A&E. The series features three to five couples, paired up by relationship experts, who agree to marry when they first meet. For the first three seasons, the experts were clinical psychologist Dr. Joseph Cilona, sexologist Dr. Logan Levkoff, sociologist Dr. Pepper Schwartz, and humanist chaplain Greg Epstein. Starting with the fourth season, the experts were Schwartz, pastor and marriage counselor Calvin Roberson, and communication and relationship expert Rachel DeAlto. Rachel DeAlto was replaced with Dr. Jessica Griffin beginning with the sixth season. Dr. Griffin stayed until the ninth season and was replaced by Dr. Viviana Coles in seasons ten and eleven. The couples spend their wedding night in a hotel before leaving for a honeymoon. Upon returning home, they live together as a married couple for the remainder of the eight weeks. Thereafter they must choose to divorce or stay married. On October 25, 2016, FYI renewed the show for a fifth season. In 2017, for its fifth season, the show moved to sister network Lifetime. The following year, two spinoffs were announced to premiere that October, Married at First Sight: Honeymoon Island and Married at First Sight: Happily Ever After.

Synopsis
Over the fifteen completed seasons of MAFS, 59 couples have been matched. 43 of them (73%) chose to stay married on Decision Day, out of which almost two-thirds have since divorced, filed for divorce, or announced their divorce. As of February 2023, this left only 12 couples married, making for a current overall success rate of 20%.

Season 1
The first season took place in New York City and northern New Jersey. This season premiered July 8, 2014. The couples were:

In March 2019, Courtney and Jason divorced after five years of marriage. Since their divorce, Courtney and Jason have both moved on. Jason married actress Roxanne Pallett in January 2020. In June 2021, they announced they were expecting their first child together. Courtney married Sherm, an accountant, in October 2020. In April 2021, they announced they were expecting their first child together. In October 2021, Courtney gave birth to her and Sherm's first child, a baby boy.

Jamie and Doug are now a family of four. The couple lost their first son, Jonathan Edward, at 17 weeks gestation in July 2016, before going on to have daughter Henley Grace in August 2017. They have spoken about subsequent struggles to conceive, experiencing a chemical pregnancy in 2018 and a miscarriage at 10 weeks along in 2019. Their son, Hendrix Douglas, was born in May 2020.

Season 2
The second season, just like the first, took place in New York City and Northern New Jersey. This season premiered March 17, 2015. The couples were:

Concluding Jaclyn's and Ryan's marriage, Jaclyn entered into another relationship in 2018 and announced she was expecting a child in 2019. She had a daughter in November 2019. As of 2021, Ryan is still single.

Davina is now married with a son named Hudson. As of 2021, Sean is married with a daughter.

Jessica Castro and Ryan DeNino had a contentious relationship, with Ryan threatening to harm Jessica on multiple occasions. Jessica filed a restraining order against him in June 2015. As of 2021, Jessica Castro is in a relationship and has a son with him. As of 2021, Ryan's status is unknown.

Season 3

The third season took place in Atlanta, Georgia. This season premiered on December 1, 2015. The couples were:

Vanessa and Tres got divorced within six months of Decision Day. Vanessa appeared on Married At First Sight: Second Chances in 2017 and married Andre Forbes. Their marriage also ended in divorce. As of 2020, Tres was in a "complicated" relationship. As of 2021, Vanessa appeared to be single.

After divorcing David, Ashley learned that he had a history of misdemeanors. In 2019, Ashley shared a photo from her wedding. In 2020, Ashley announced that she was pregnant and gave birth to a son in April 2021.

In April 2018, Samantha married Chris Wise and in September gave birth to a daughter. Samantha and Neil are still friends. In April 2020, Neil revealed that he is in a relationship.

Season 4
The fourth season of Married at First Sight premiered on Tuesday, July 26, 2016. The setting was South Florida (particularly Miami) and in this season, two new specialists joined along with sociologist Dr. Pepper Schwartz: communication and relationship expert Rachel DeAlto, and marriage counselor Pastor Calvin Roberson. Doctors Joseph Cilona and Logan Levkoff exited the series after season three. The couples were:

1 Heather and Derek left in the middle of the experiment.

Sonia and Nick divorced after about a year of marriage. That same year, Nick announced that he was in a relationship and they were expecting twins. In 2019, Nick was in a work accident that left him partially paralyzed. He has recovered from the incident. Sonia has started a podcast and as of 2021 is still single.

Heather and Derek left the show ten days after they were married.

Tom and Lillian announced their divorce in May 2017. As of 2021, Lillian was single. In 2019, Tom announced that he was engaged to Michelle, and they were married three months later. Tom is a step-father to Michelle's two children from a previous marriage.

Season 5
The fifth season of Married at First Sight was renewed on October 25, 2016.  For this season, the show moved to the Lifetime channel.  The first episode aired on April 20, 2017, and featured couples in Chicago. The couples were:

Ashley Petta and Anthony D'Amico are now a family of four. They announced they were expecting their first child in August 2018. They welcomed their first child, daughter Mila Rose, in January 2019. In July 2020, they announced they were expecting their second child, which was later revealed to be another girl. In February 2021, their second daughter, Vaeda Marie, was born.

As of October 2021, Cody is in a relationship. Danielle is still single.

As of October 2021, Nate is in a relationship, and has his own business. Sheila's status is unknown.

Season 6
The sixth season of Married at First Sight was renewed on the Lifetime channel.  The first of the episodes aired on January 2, 2018, and featured couples in Boston. Relationship expert Dr. Jessica Griffin joined the show as a specialist, replacing Rachel DeAlto who left after Season 5. The couples were:

Shawniece Jackson and Jephte Pierre welcomed their first child, a baby girl named Laura Denise Pierre, in August 2018.

Jonathan Francetic and relationship expert Dr. Jessica Griffin revealed they had struck up a romance following his time on the show when Griffin announced she would not be returning to Married At First Sight as an expert for Season 9. They began dating more than five months after the season wrapped. The pair became engaged in April 2019. Their original wedding date was set for October 2020 but was postponed due to the COVID-19 pandemic. As of October 18, 2022, Fracentic and Griffin are officially married.

In September 2020, Jaclyn married Dane, with whom she had been in a relationship with since late 2018. As of 2021, Ryan is still single.

Season 7
The seventh season of Married at First Sight was renewed on the Lifetime channel, and featured couples from Dallas, with the first episode airing on July 10, 2018. The couples were:

Danielle Bergman-Dodd and Bobby Dodd have two children together. Their first child, daughter Olivia Nicole, was born in February 2019. Their son, Bobby Dodd IV, was born in December 2020.

In July 2020, Tristan married Rachel, who he had been in a relationship with since early 2019. In March 2021, they welcomed their first child together, a baby boy named Phoenix. As of 2021, Mia is still single.

As of 2021, both Dave and Amber are still single.

Season 8
The eighth season of Married at First Sight featured couples from Philadelphia, was the first season that a fourth couple were added, and premiered on January 1, 2019. The couples were:

Stephanie and AJ are still married. In 2021, after 3 years of marriage, the couple relocated to Key West, Florida.

Kristine and Keith are still married. In April 2019, after 8 months of marriage, the couple bought a house.

Jasmine is now in a relationship, though her marital status in unknown. She welcomed her first child, a son, in December 2020. As of 2021, Will is still single.

As of 2021, Kate is still single. In early 2021, Luke was in a relationship, however, due to lack of social media posts in recent months, the status of that relationship is currently unknown.

Season 9
The ninth season of Married at First Sight featured couples from Charlotte, North Carolina and premiered on June 12, 2019. Dr. Jessica Griffin did not return after revealing she was in a relationship with Season 6 cast member Jon Francetic, with the couple later getting engaged and going into business together. She was replaced by relationship expert Dr. Viviana Coles. The couples were:

In September 2020, Deonna McNeill and Greg Okotie announced that they are expecting their first child together. In February 2021, Deonna give birth to their son, Declan.

Elizabeth Bice and Jamie Thompson are still married. After decision day, the couple relocated to California.

Season 10
The tenth season of Married at First Sight featured couples from the suburbs outside of Washington, D.C., particularly Arlington and Alexandria, Virginia. This was the first season that a fifth couple was added. The first episode aired on January 1, 2020. The couples were:

In July 2021, Austin and Jessica revealed that they are expecting their first child, due in November 2021. In October 2021, Austin and Jessica revealed that their first child would be a boy. Their son, Westin Paul, was born in November 2021.

While the season is marketed as taking place in DC and features shots in the tourist-heavy sections of the District, the majority of the show takes place in Northern Virginia with some areas in Montgomery County, Maryland. However, the weddings take place in the District neighborhood of Georgetown.

Season 11
The eleventh season of Married at First Sight featured couples from New Orleans. The first episode premiered on July 15, 2020. The couples were:

Miles and Woody made Married At First Sight history by being the first best friends to apply together and be selected at the same time.

Amani and Woody welcomed their first child, a boy named Reign Randall, in June 2022.

Season 12
The twelfth season of Married at First Sight takes place in Atlanta. It is the first to feature a divorced candidate. The first episode premiered January 13, 2021. The couples are:

Another first occurred in this season when Chris' former fiancée contacted him while he was on his honeymoon to let him know she was pregnant.

In July 2022, Briana and Vincent announced that they were expecting their first child. In August 2022, they revealed that their first child would be a girl. Their daughter, Aury Bella, was born in January 2023.

Season 13
The thirteenth season of Married at First Sight featured couples from Houston and was first aired on July 21, 2021.

Season 14
The fourteenth season of Married at First Sight featured couples from Boston.

1 Alyssa and Chris left in the middle of the experiment.

Season 15
The fifteenth season of Married at First Sight featured couples from San Diego, which premiered on July 6, 2022 on Lifetime.

1 Morgan and Binh left in the middle of the experiment.

Season 16
The sixteenth season of Married at First Sight will feature couples from Nashville and will be aired on Lifetime, premiering January 4, 2023.

1 Domynique and Mackinley left in the middle of the experiment.

Season 17 
The seventeenth season of Married at First Sight will feature couples from Denver.

Timeline of cast

Spinoffs
Married at First Sight has had eight spinoffs:
Married at First Sight: The First Year
Married Life
Married at First Sight: Second Chances
Jamie and Doug Plus One
Married at First Sight: Honeymoon Island
Married at First Sight: Happily Ever After
Married at First Sight: Couples' Cam
Married at First Sight: Unmatchables

Married at First Sight: The First Year
Married at First Sight: The First Year follows the lives of the two Season 1 couples that remained married from the six-month mark to the one-year anniversary and beyond. The couples are Jamie Otis-Hehner and Doug Hehner, and Courtney Hendrix-Carrion and Jason Carrion. The first episode premiered on January 13, 2015. A total of two seasons have been shown for this spinoff.

Married Life
Married Life continues to follow the daily lives of two married couples from Season 1, Jamie Otis-Hehner and Doug Hehner and Courtney Hendrix-Carrion and Jason Carrion. The first season premiered May 5, 2015. The second season premiered January 24, 2017.

Married at First Sight: Second Chances
Two participants from Season 3, Vanessa Nelson and David Norton, both took part in the first season of the second spinoff Married at First Sight: Second Chances. Both David and Vanessa selected from a group of men (for Nelson) and women (for Norton) to date in a format similar to that of The Bachelor or The Bachelorette, ultimately ending with each of them choosing someone to marry. The groups were narrowed down from one hundred (in a speed dating-like situation) to twenty-five, to ten. After Vanessa and David each picked their top ten, they eliminated one person each episode (with the exception of one week's double elimination) until finding 'the one'. The first season premiered on 27 April 2017 and concluded on 6 July 2017 with Vanessa becoming engaged to Andre, although they ultimately ended their relationship, and David choosing to marry no one.

Jamie and Doug Plus One
Jamie and Doug Plus One continues to follow the lives of Jamie Otis-Hehner and Doug Hehner from the time right before the birth of their daughter Henley, through the first months of new parenthood. The series shows the couple's struggles with caring for their newborn while trying to maintain intimacy in their marriage.

Married at First Sight: Honeymoon Island
Married at First Sight: Honeymoon Island is an eight-episode series about sixteen singles on an exotic island attempting to match themselves. Casting includes unmatched singles from earlier seasons of the original, fan favorites, and new candidates. Married at First Sight: Honeymoon Island premiered on October 23, 2018, and the participants are:

At the end of the season, the following participants remain:

Married at First Sight: Happily Ever After
Married at First Sight: Happily Ever After follows the lives of couples from previous seasons who still remain married and are expecting children, including Ashley Petta and Anthony D'Amico from Season 5, Shawniece Jackson and Jephte Pierre from Season 6, and Danielle Bergman and Bobby Dodd from season 7. The first episode premiered on October 30, 2018.

Married at First Sight: Couples' Cam
Married at First Sight: Couples' Cam premiered on May 20, 2020.

Married at First Sight: Unmatchables
Married at First Sight: Unmatchables premiered in 2021.

International versions
The format created in Denmark has been adapted in several countries.

References

External links
 

2010s American reality television series
2014 American television series debuts
2020s American reality television series
American television series based on Danish television series
FYI (American TV channel) original programming
Lifetime (TV network) original programming
American dating and relationship reality television series
Television shows filmed in New York City
Television shows filmed in New Jersey
Television shows filmed in Georgia (U.S. state)
Television shows filmed in Florida
Television shows filmed in Illinois
Television shows filmed in Boston
Television shows filmed in Texas
Television shows filmed in Pennsylvania
Television shows filmed in North Carolina
Television shows filmed in Washington, D.C.
Television shows filmed in Virginia
Television shows filmed in New Orleans
Television shows filmed in California
Wedding television shows